Traian Stănescu may refer to:

 Traian Stănescu (actor) (1940–2022), a Romanian actor.
  (1889–1958), a Romanian general.